The 2019 Sun Belt Conference softball tournament was held at the Bobcat Softball Complex on the campus of the Texas State University in San Marcos, Texas, from May 8 to May 11, 2019. The tournament used a double-elimination format for the tournament as in past years. Louisiana, the winner of the tournament, earned the Sun Belt Conference's automatic bid to the 2019 NCAA Division I softball tournament.

Seeding
In a change from previous years, the top eight teams (based on conference results) from the conference earned invites to the tournament. The teams were seeded based on conference winning percentage, with the bottom four seeds competing in a play-in round. The remaining four teams then played a two bracket, double-elimination tournament. The winner of each bracket played each other in the championship final.

Results

Play-in round

Tournament

Notes 

 Louisiana's championship victory is their 15th Sun Belt Conference Tournament Championships, their 1st with Glasco as head coach, and marks their 12th 50-win season

References

Tournament
Sun Belt Conference softball tournament
Sun Belt softball tournament